Tower of the Firstborn is a 2000 Italian-French adventure television film directed by Alberto Negrin and starring Ben Cross, Peter Weller, Bernard-Pierre Donnadieu, Marco Bonini, Ione Skye and Heino Ferch. It was based on the novel La torre della solitudine by Valerio Massimo Manfredi.

Plot   
Young and attractive archaeologist Diane Shannon intends to unravel the mystery linked to her father, who disappeared in Africa during the search for the "Tower of the First Born", a mysterious place that according to ancient legends would keep the secret of space and time, and would bestow knowledge and wisdom. Diane embarks on the journey ignoring the warnings of her friends and overcoming various dangers, clashing with a sheikh and his horde of savage desert marauders, and meeting the brave officer Léon in command of the foreign legion. Finally, together with Rashid, a mysterious prince of the desert and a friend of her missing father, Diane finds the mysterious place and her father.

Cast  
 Ben Cross as Michael Shannon/Zadick
 Peter Weller as John Shannon 
 Marco Bonini as Rashid 
 Guy Lankester as Neil Hogan 
 Bernard-Pierre Donnadieu as Abdurasam 
 Romina Mondello as Adriel 
 Heino Ferch as Léon
 Ione Skye as Diane Shannon
 Gabriele Ferzetti as Father Jacob
 Antonella Lualdi as Mother Superior 
 Rodolfo Corsato as Sassard
 Martin Semmelrogge as Geroq 
 Gianni Garko as Commander 
 Sal Borgese as Husuf

References

External links
 
Tower of the Firstborn at Yahoo! Movies

2000 films
2000s adventure films
Films directed by Alberto Negrin
Films scored by Ennio Morricone
2000s English-language films